Monocrepidius elegans is a species of click beetles (insects in the family Elateridae). It has a Palaearctic distribution.

References

External links 

Elateridae
Beetles described in 1878